Harold Lewis (1923–2011) was an American physicist.

Harold Lewis may also refer to:
Harold Craig Lewis (1944–2013), American politician from Pennsylvania
Harold Harwell Lewis (1901–1985), Communist American poet

See also
Harry Lewis (disambiguation)
Hal Lewis (disambiguation)